Soles de Santo Domingo Este is a professional basketball team based in Santo Domingo Este, Santo Domingo Dominican Republic. The team currently plays in Dominican top division Liga Nacional de Baloncesto. The team was formerly known as Cocolos de San Pedro de Macorís and changed names and location upon new ownership.

References

Basketball teams established in 2005
Basketball teams in the Dominican Republic